Masud is a given name and a surname, commonly found in the Middle East and Asia. It has a variety of spellings including Masoud, Massoud, Massoude, Massudeh, Masood, Masʽud, Masud, Mashud, Messaoud, Mesut, Mesud, or Mosād. People with the name Masud include:

People with the given name Masud 
 Masud Sabri, Uyghur governor of Xinjiang
 Masud Jani, 13th century governor of Bengal
 Masud Khan, British psychoanalyst
 Masud Ghnaim, an Israeli Arab politician
 Masud Minhas, Indian field hockey player

People with the surname Masud 
 Ghiyath Ad-din Masud, King Mesud II
 Ala ud din Masud, Ruler of the Mamluk dynasty (Delhi)
 Faisal Masud, Medical doctor
 Khalid Masud, Pakistani scholar
 Mitty Masud, Pakistan Air Force personnel
 Mohammad Masud, Iranian journalist
 Muhammad Khalid Masud, Director of an Islamic Research Institute
 Naiyer Masud, Indian Urdu short-story writer and literary critic

Persian given names
Arabic given names
Persian-language surnames
Arabic-language surnames